The 2017–18 season was Luceafărul Oradea's 12th season in the Romanian football league system, and their 4th season in the Liga II. The club started the season with Ioan Blidaru as owner, Cornel Țălnar as coach and with Liga I promotion ambitions. After a very bad start and some tensions in the squad and leadership of the team Blidaru retired and the club was one step away from the dissolution. Shortly the team was bought by Nicolae Sarcină and saved from disappearance, but most of the players left the club and a squad reconstruction in the middle of the season was not easy, so Luceafărul has had oscillating evolutions.

Players

First team squad

Out on loan

Club Officials

Board of directors

Current technical staff

Pre-season and friendlies

Competitions

Liga II

League table

Result round by round

Results

Cupa României

See also

2017–18 Cupa României
Liga II

Notes and references

CS Luceafărul Oradea seasons
CS Luceafărul Oradea